Surma Legislative Assembly constituency is one of the 60 Legislative Assembly constituencies of Tripura state in India.

It is part of Dhalai district and is reserved for candidates belonging to the Scheduled Castes.

Members of the Legislative Assembly 

^ by-poll

Election results

By-election 2022

2018

See also
 List of constituencies of the Tripura Legislative Assembly
 Dhalai district

References

Dhalai district
Assembly constituencies of Tripura